Demoni is a Canadian-Bulgarian animated short film, directed by Theodore Ushev and released in 2012. A music video for the song of the same name by Bulgarian musician Kottarashky, the film depicts scenes of Eastern European folk art on a spinning vinyl record.

The film was a Canadian Screen Award nominee for Best Animated Short Film at the 1st Canadian Screen Awards.

References

External links
 
 

2012 short films
2012 films
2012 animated films
Canadian animated short films
Bulgarian animated films
Bulgarian short films
Films directed by Theodore Ushev
Animated music videos
2010s Canadian films